Gidon Kremer (born 27 February 1947) is a Latvian classical violinist, artistic director, and founder of Kremerata Baltica.

Life and career
Gidon Kremer was born in Riga. His father was Jewish and had survived the  Holocaust. His mother had German-Swedish origins. His grandfather Karl Brückner was a well-known musicologist and violinist in Riga. He began playing the violin at the age of four, receiving instruction from his father and his grandfather, who were both professional violinists. He went on to study at the Riga School of Music, where his teacher was mainly Voldemar Sturestep (Voldemārs Stūresteps). From 1965, Kremer studied with David Oistrakh at the Moscow Conservatory. In 1967, he won third prize at the Queen Elisabeth Music Competition in Brussels. In 1969, he won second prize at the Montreal International Violin Competition (shared with Oleh Krysa), followed by first prize at the Paganini Competition in Genoa, and finally first prize again in 1970 at the International Tchaikovsky Competition in Moscow.

Kremer's first concert in the West was in Vienna's Musikverein in 1970, where he played with Thomas Schippers and the Wiener Symphoniker. He debuted in Germany at the festival Bachwoche Ansbach and in the Berlin Philharmonie in 1975 and in London under André Previn in 1976, followed by appearances at the Salzburg Festival in 1976 and in New York City and in Japan in 1977. In 1980, he left the USSR and settled in Germany. In 1981, Kremer founded a chamber music festival in Lockenhaus, Austria, with a focus on new and unconventional programming, serving as artistic director for 30 years until 2011. In 1997, Kremer founded the Kremerata Baltica chamber orchestra, composed of young players from the Baltic region. He was also among the artistic directors of the festival "Art Projekt 92" in Munich and is director of the Musiksommer Gstaad festival (1996/97) and Basel ("les musiques") in Switzerland. In 2007–2008, he and Kremerata Baltica toured with the classical musical comedy duo Igudesman & Joo. He also made regular appearances at the Verbier Festival until the summer of 2011, when he publicly criticised the perceived 'star culture' aspect of the festival and withdrew from the festival.

He has performed works by Astor Piazzolla (in the Hommage à Piazzolla recordings), George Enescu, Alban Berg, Dmitri Shostakovich, Béla Bartók, Philip Glass, Alfred Schnittke, Victor Kissine, Mieczysław Weinberg, Arthur Lourié and John Adams. He also performed works by Leonid Desyatnikov, Alexander Raskatov, Alexander Vustin, Lera Auerbach, Pēteris Vasks, Arvo Pärt, Victoria Poleva, Valentyn Sylvestrov, Stevan Kovacs Tickmayer. Among the many composers who have dedicated works to him are Sofia Gubaidulina (Offertorium) and Luigi Nono (La lontananza nostalgica utopica futura), Alfred Schnittke, Giya Kancheli, Victor Kissine.

His partners in performance include Valery Afanassiev, Martha Argerich, Mikhail Pletnev, Oleg Maisenberg, Vadim Sakharov, Mischa Maisky, Yo-Yo Ma, Clemens Hagen, Giedrė Dirvanauskaitė, Yuri Bashmet, Kim Kashkashian, Thomas Zehetmair, Tatiana Grindenko and Per Arne Glorvigen.
 
He has a large discography on the Deutsche Grammophon label, for which he has recorded since 1978.  He has also recorded for Philips Records, EMI, Decca Records, ECM and Nonesuch Records. Celebrating the 70th birthday (27 February 2017) of Gidon Kremer, on 14 October 2016 Deutsche Grammophon released an original jackets box set "GIDON KREMER Complete Concerto Recordings on Deutsche Grammophon". ECM Records marked the occasion with a new album of all Mieczysław Weinberg's chamber symphonies, released in January 2017, recorded together with Kremerata Baltica.

In other media, Kremer played the role of Paganini in Peter Schamoni's 1983 film Frühlingssinfonie ("Spring Symphony") and was the music director of the film Le joueur de violon by Charles Van Damme.

Kremer is the author of four books on music, including Fragments of Childhood (Kindheitsplitter) and Letters to a Young Pianist (2013).

Honours and awards
 Pour le Mérite for Sciences and Arts (2016, Germany)
 Praemium Imperiale award (2016, Japan)
 Grammy Award nomination in 2015 for recording “Mieczysław Weinberg” (ECM New Series, 2014) in the category of Classical Music: Best Classical Compendium 
 Una Vita Nella Musica – Artur Rubinstein Prize from Venice in 2011
 Grande Ufficiale Ordine al Merito della Repubblica Italiana (23 December 2011, Italy) 
 Lifetime Achievement Award of the Istanbul Music Festival in 2010
 Rolf Schock Prize for the Musical Arts from Stockholm in 2008
 Saeculum Glashütte Original MusikFestspielPreis from Dresden in 2007
 Grammy Award in 2002 for recording “After Mozart” (Nonesuch, 2001) in the category of Classical Music: Best Small Ensemble Performance
 ECHO Klassik prize in 2002 for recording “After Mozart” (Nonesuch, 2001)
 IMC-UNESCO International Music Prize (2001, performers category, jointly awarded to Oumou Sangaré)
 Lithuanian Great Duke Gediminas Medal (2000, Lithuania)
 Triumph Prize 2000 (Moscow)
 Latvian Great Music Award (1995, 2004, Latvia)
 Officer of the Order of the Three Stars (12 March 1997, Latvia)
 Baltic Assembly Prize for Literature, the Arts and Science (1997)
 Léonie Sonning Music Prize (1989, Denmark)
 Ernst von Siemens Music Prize (1982)
 International Tchaikovsky Competition (first prize, 1970, Moscow)
 Paganini Competition (first prize, 1969, Genoa)
 Montreal International Violin Competition (second prize, 1969, Montreal)
Queen Elisabeth Music Competition (third prize, 1967, Brussels)

References

External links

Gidon Kremer website
Kremerata Baltica official website
Interview with Gidon Kremer, 19 May 1997
Gidon Kremer letter to Verbier Festival "Why I quit the celebrity ratrace"

Sources

1947 births
Living people
Latvian classical violinists
Soviet classical violinists
20th-century classical violinists
Male classical violinists
Jewish classical violinists
Soviet expatriates in Germany
Latvian Jews
Musicians from Riga
Moscow Conservatory alumni
Latvian Academy of Music alumni
Nonesuch Records artists
Deutsche Grammophon artists
Prize-winners of the International Tchaikovsky Competition
Prize-winners of the Queen Elisabeth Competition
Paganini Competition prize-winners
Ernst von Siemens Music Prize winners
Rolf Schock Prize laureates
Grammy Award winners
Honorary Members of the Royal Academy of Music
Recipients of the Léonie Sonning Music Prize
Knights Commander of the Order of Merit of the Federal Republic of Germany
Recipients of the Pour le Mérite (civil class)
Recipients of the Praemium Imperiale
21st-century classical violinists
Recipients of the Order of the Cross of Terra Mariana, 4th Class